, widely known for its nickname , is a multi-purpose hall located in Higashi-ku, Sapporo, Hokkaidō, Japan. Owned by Sapporo city, the dome is run by the Sapporo Health Sports Foundation.

Overview 
The dome is 132.4 m in diameter, 43 m in height, and has an area of 17,865 m2. The dome is located on the outskirts of central Sapporo city, and is near Sakaemachi Station, which is on the Tōhō Line of the Sapporo Municipal Subway. The dome also has a park golf course, tennis court, and parking lot.

Along with a number of sporting events including marathons, basketball, and football competitions, the dome holds other events such as the Golden Market, which is the biggest flea market in Sapporo and is held annually at the dome.

2009 marked the 60th anniversary of the Sapporo Snow Festival, and in this year the second venue of the festival was moved from the Sapporo Satoland site to the Tsudome site. This transference of the sites was done to reduce the parking lot costs by restricting a large number of cars visiting from the site and to help alleviate traffic congestion. Although the parking lot has a capacity of 306 cars, the Tsudome site did not allow parking for cars and asked visitors to use public transportation to reach the Tsudome site during the Festival this year.

See also 
 Higashi-ku, Sapporo
 Sapporo Dome
 Sapporo Satoland
 Sapporo Snow Festival

References

External links 
 The Sapporo Community Dome "Tsudome"

Higashi-ku, Sapporo
Indoor arenas in Japan
Sports venues in Sapporo